The trough battery was a variant of Alessandro Volta's voltaic pile and was designed by the Scottish professor of chemistry William Cruickshank in 1800.

Disadvantage of the pile 

Volta's battery consisted of brine-soaked pieces of cloth sandwiched between zinc and copper discs, piled in a stack. This resulted in electrolyte leakage as the weight of the discs squeezed the electrolyte out of the cloth.

Advantage of the trough 

Cruickshank solved this problem by laying the battery on its side in a rectangular box. The inside of this box was lined with shellac for insulation, and pairs of welded-together zinc and copper plates were laid out in this box, evenly spaced. The spaces between the plates (the troughs) were filled with dilute sulfuric acid.  So long as the box was not knocked about, there was no risk of electrolyte spillage.

See also 
 List of battery types

References 

Battery types